Derek Daypuck (born 20 February 1978 in London, Ontario) is a Canadian former Rugby union player. Daypuck played 17 tests for Canada.

References

1978 births
Living people
Canada international rugby union players
Rugby union fly-halves
Sportspeople from London, Ontario
Commonwealth Games rugby sevens players of Canada
Canada international rugby sevens players
Rugby sevens players at the 2006 Commonwealth Games